Matthew Evans is one of two Canadians who developed and patented an incandescent light bulb, on July 24, 1874, five years before Thomas Alva Edison's U.S. patent on the device.

Evans, from Toronto, Ontario, and his friend Henry Woodward, made the light bulb by sending electricity through a filament made of carbon.

The two men had patented it but did not have enough money to develop their invention, so they sold their US patent 181,613 to Thomas Edison for US$5,000 ($US 100,000 in 2006 dollars).  They also granted Edison an exclusive licence to their equivalent Canadian patent.

External links
 The First Electric Light Bulb

Canadian inventors
People from Old Toronto
Year of death missing
Year of birth missing